Jack Vale (27 April 1905 – 12 April 1970) was an Australian rules footballer who played with Carlton and Fitzroy in the Victorian Football League (VFL).

Notes

External links 
 
 Jack Vale's profile at Blueseum

1905 births
1970 deaths
Australian rules footballers from Victoria (Australia)
Carlton Football Club players
Fitzroy Football Club players